Xavier Marques (born Francisco Xavier Ferreira Marques) was a Brazilian journalist, politician, novelist, poet, biographer and essayist. He was born on the island of Itaparica, BA, on December 3, 1861, and died in Salvador, BA, on October 30, 1942.

He began primary education in his hometown but soon moved to the city of Salvador, enrolling in the school of Canon Francisco Bernardino de Sousa. In the Bahian capital, he dedicated himself to journalism, an activity that was only interrupted by his political work. He served two legislative terms: State Representative in Bahia, from 1915 to 1921, and Federal, from 1921 to 1924.

His debut novel Boto and Company (1897) was followed by the novel Jana e Joel (1899), considered his best work. His fiction has been termed regionalist, set as it is in the province of Bahia. He won several literary awards, including an award from the Brazilian Academy of Letters, in 1910, for the novel Sargento Pedro.

He was the second occupant of Chair 28 in the Academia Brasileira, to which he was elected on July 24, 1919, in succession to Inglês de Sousa. He was received into the Academy by Goulart de Andrade on September 17, 1920.

References

Brazilian writers
1861 births
1942 deaths